The UCW-Zero Heavyweight Championship is the primary singles championship title in Ultra Championship Wrestling-Zero. It was first won by Blitz Mason in March 2003 and defended throughout the state of Utah, most often Salt Lake City, Utah, but also in the Rocky Mountains and the Southwest United States. The title was formerly recognized by AWA Superstars from 2005 to 2007, and then by the National Wrestling Alliance when the promotion became an NWA territory that same year. On February 26, 2011, the UCW-Zero Heavyweight Championship was around the waist of Los Mochis Paco until it was stolen by Tyler Cintron after Junior X attacked Paco. Later, Paco retrieved his belt back from Tyler Cintron. The following show however, Tyler Cintron walks into the ring with his own UCW-Zero Heavyweight Championship. UCW Director Blitz decide to make a Triple Threat TLC Match to determine the Undisputed UCW-Zero Heavyweight Champion which took place on June 4, 2011. Los Mochis Paco was the victor to become the Undisputed Heavyweight Champion. It would however be short lived because Los Mochis Paco was attacked by Black Out in the back and broke his leg and was unable to defend it. Two Weeks later on June 18, 2011, Director for the night and Former 4 time UCW-Zero Heavyweight Champion Martin Casaus made a Gauntlet Match to determine a New Champion. In the end, it was Junior X that prevailed and became the NEW UCW-Zero Heavyweight Champion. 2011 Rocky Mountain Rumble Champion Kid Kade went on to win the UCW-Zero Heavyweight Champion after defeating Junior X at "Meltdown Mayhem" on August 13, 2011.

Title history

References

External links
UCW-Zero Heavyweight Title at TitleHistories.com
UCW-Zero Heavyweight Title at Solie's Title Histories
   NWA UCW-Zero Heavyweight Championship

Regional professional wrestling championships